Integrated Management Associates (also Neotech or Neothink) is a publisher and distributor of books and articles, based in Henderson, Nevada.  It was founded by Wallace Ward, also known as Frank R. Wallace, and is now run by his son Wallace H. Ward under the name Mark Hamilton.

History
The company was founded by Wallace Ward as I & 0 Publishing in 1968 to publish his own work written under a number of pen names, including Frank R. Wallace. Since Ward's death in 2006 the company has been run by his son, Wallace H. Ward, using the trademarked name Mark Hamilton.

Australian Fair Trading Minister Margaret Keech criticized Neo-Tech as a group of "con-artists", for claiming to select "a small handful of 'special' individuals" to receive "secret wisdom of ages", and then asking the individuals to pay money to obtain these "secrets". The company was the subject of a 2000 ruling by the Advertising Standards Authority of the United Kingdom, in which the Authority claimed Neo-Tech had "not provided evidence, other than anecdotal, to show the guaranteed earnings, improvements to health, and other benefits ... had been, or could be, attained".

Operations
According to the Los Angeles Times IMA's business plan consists of sending advertising mail to hundreds of thousands of people, offering them free pamphlets explaining the "secrets of wealth and power" known to, e.g., Warren Buffett and Sumner Redstone.  The ultimate goal is to convince recipients to purchase a copy of a 1200-page work  by Hamilton for $135.50.  

The book is about a woman, "Miss Annabelle," who has a number of super-intelligent children who manage to solve all the problems facing humanity, including death itself.  One of Miss Annabelle's children is elected President of the United States under the aegis of the "Twelve Visions Party."  Mark Hamilton is the founder of an actual American political party of the same name.

IMA has operated under a number of different names, including "Neo-Tech Publishing", "The Nouveau Tech Society", "Neothink Society", "The League",  "The Secret Society," "The Society of Secrets", "Newly-Forming Neo-Tech/Illuminati Societies", and "The Athenian Secret Society.".  Authors have included Frank Wallace, Mark Hamilton, Eric Savage, Drew Ellis, Matt Keys, Brett Peters, Neil Lock, Carl Watner, Yasuhiko Kimura and Ted Nicholas.

References

External links
Official NeoThink website

Publishing companies of the United States
Publishing companies established in 1968
1968 establishments in Nevada